Granville Craig was a prominent Cherokee farmer living near Welch and Bluejacket, Indian Territory, in the late nineteenth century. Craig County, Oklahoma is named after him.

References

Cherokee Nation people (1794–1907)
People from Craig County, Oklahoma